Watt Powell Park was a stadium, primarily used for baseball, in the Kanawha City neighborhood of Charleston, West Virginia. It was built in 1948, and was home to several Charleston minor-league franchises: the Charleston Senators of the Class A Central League (1949-1951) and the AAA American Association (1952-1960), the Charleston Marlins of the AAA International League (1961), the Charleston Indians of the AA Eastern League (1962-1964), the Charleston Charlies of the AAA International League (1971-1983) and Charleston Wheelers, later the Charleston Alley Cats of the Class A South Atlantic League (1987-2004). 

Watt Powell Park held 4,474 people, and was known for the scenic view of nearby hillsides. Watt Powell also was known for the CSX railroad line hard by the south wall of the stadium; some fans were known to watch games from there rather than pay to enter the stadium.  Watt Powell Park was bounded by MacCorkle Avenue on the front (North) side, 35th Street on the east, and South Park Road on the west. On the south side of the park, a ridge of hills formed a natural boundary.

The stadium earned a reputation as a pitchers' park due to the lack of power hitting over its lifespan.  Part of this can be attributed to its dimensions; the field was 340 feet from home plate to the wall in left field, 330 feet in right, and a daunting 420 feet in deep center field. The outfield walls were also 12 feet high the whole distance around, higher than walls seen elsewhere in baseball. The center field wall included a 90-degree, inward facing angle, reminiscent of the old Griffith Stadium in Washington, DC.

Watt Powell Park closed in 2005 after the opening of Appalachian Power Park in Charleston's East End, near downtown. The Alley Cats moved to the new stadium and renamed themselves the West Virginia Power. The stadium was sold to the University of Charleston which then sold two thirds to the region's largest hospital, Charleston Area Medical Center, whose largest facility is a few blocks away. Demolition of the stadium began in late 2005 and in 2015 a new CAMC cancer clinic opened on the site.

External links
Ballpark Reviews: Watt Powell Park
Digital Ballparks: Watt Powell Park
Ball Parks of the Minor Leagues: Watt Powell Park
Minor League Ballparks: Watt Powell Park

Defunct baseball venues in the United States
Defunct minor league baseball venues
Demolished buildings and structures in West Virginia
Buildings and structures in Charleston, West Virginia
Baseball venues in West Virginia
Defunct sports venues in West Virginia